Shaoshan railway is a major rail corridor in Xiangtan, Hunan, China. The railway is from Xiangshao station of Xiangtan County to Shaoshan station in Qingxi Town. It links Hunan–Guizhou railway at Xiangshao station. The railway is under the jurisdiction of Guangzhou Railway Group (GRG).

Construction of the railway commenced on February 5, 1967 and was completed at the year's end.

References

Railway lines in China
Rail transport in Hunan
Railway lines opened in 1967
1967 establishments in China